Branxholme is a village in the Scottish Borders.

Branxholme may also refer to:

 Branxholme Castle, near Branxholme, Scottish Borders
 Branxholme, Victoria, Australia

See also 
Branxholm, Tasmania
Branksome (disambiguation)